Andrew Phillip Brown (born 1951) is a conservation biologist and taxonomist at the Western Australian Department of Environment and Conservation. He is also curator of Orchidaceae and Myoporaceae at the Western Australian Herbarium and a foundation member of the Australian Orchid Foundation and the Western Australia Native Orchid Study and Conservation Group. He is the author of more than 100 journal articles and seven books on the flora of Western Australia, including a field guide to the eremophilas of that state.

References

External links

20th-century Australian botanists
Australian conservationists
Australian taxonomists
Orchidologists
1951 births
Living people
Botanists active in Australia
Botany in Western Australia
Place of birth missing (living people)
21st-century Australian botanists